The 1988 NFL season was the 69th regular season of the National Football League. The Cardinals relocated from St. Louis, Missouri to the Phoenix, Arizona area becoming the Phoenix Cardinals but remained in the NFC East division. The playoff races came down to the regular season's final week, with the Seattle Seahawks winning the AFC West by one game, and the Philadelphia Eagles and San Francisco 49ers winning their respective divisions in a five-way tie, with the New Orleans Saints and New York Giants losing the NFC Wild Card berth to the Los Angeles Rams on tiebreakers.

1988 marked the final seasons for legendary head coaches Tom Landry of Dallas and Bill Walsh of San Francisco as well as the final full year for commissioner Pete Rozelle.

The season ended with Super Bowl XXIII when the San Francisco 49ers defeated the Cincinnati Bengals 20–16 at the Joe Robbie Stadium in Florida.

Transactions

Retirements
January 19, 1988: The Pittsburgh Steelers announce that Donnie Shell and John Stallworth have retired from professional football.

Draft
The 1988 NFL Draft was held from April 24 to 25, 1988 at New York City’s Marriott Marquis. With the first pick, the Atlanta Falcons selected linebacker Aundray Bruce from the Auburn University.

Officiating changes
Johnny Grier became the first African-American in NFL history to be promoted to referee. Grier replaced long time referee Bob Frederic, who retired in the offseason. Grier was the field judge in the previous season's Super Bowl XXII, which was the same game that Doug Williams of the Washington Redskins became the first African-American quarterback to win the Super Bowl.

Major rule changes
A standard system of two time intervals between plays are established (and would be timed using the play clock): For normal plays, the offensive team has 45 seconds to snap the ball after the previous play is signaled dead. After time outs and other administrative stoppages, the time limit is 30 seconds beginning after the Referee signals that the ball is ready to resume play.
If a fumble occurs during an extra point attempt, only the fumbling player can recover and/or advance the ball. This change closes a loophole in the "Stabler Fumble Rule" that was enacted during the 1979 NFL season in reaction to the Holy Roller Game.
The penalty for running into the kicker was changed from five yards and an automatic first down to just five yards.

1988 deaths
Alan Ameche: Having played for the Baltimore Colts in the 1950s, he died of a heart attack on August 8, 1988 at age 55 at Methodist Hospital in Houston, Texas, a few days after undergoing another heart bypass surgery. 
Steve Chomyszak
David Croudip: The Atlanta Falcons cornerback died on October 10 after a cocaine overdose.
Hall Haynes
Clarke Hinkle
Joe Don Looney
Nick Pietrosante
Art Rooney: The Pittsburgh Steelers founding owner died on August 25 following complications from a stroke.
Joey Sternaman

Preseason

American Bowl
A series of National Football League pre-season exhibition games that were held at sites outside the United States, the only American Bowl game in 1988 was held at London's Wembley Stadium.

Regular season

Scheduling formula

Highlights of the 1988 season included:
Thanksgiving: Two games were played on Thursday, November 24, featuring Minnesota at Detroit and Houston at Dallas, with Minnesota and Houston winning.

Final standings

Tiebreakers
Cincinnati was the top AFC playoff seed ahead of Buffalo based on head-to-head victory (1–0).
Indianapolis finished ahead of New England in the AFC East based on better record against common opponents (7–5 to Patriots’ 6–6).
Cleveland finished ahead of Houston in the AFC Central based on better division record (4–2 to Oilers’ 3–3).
San Francisco was the second NFC playoff seed ahead of Philadelphia on better record against common opponents (5–3 to Eagles’ 5–4).
Philadelphia finished first in the NFC East based on head-to-head sweep of the N.Y. Giants (2–0).
Washington finished third in the NFC East based on better division record (4–4) than Phoenix (3–5).
Detroit finished fourth in the NFC Central based on head-to-head sweep of Green Bay (2–0).
San Francisco finished first in the NFC West based on better head-to-head record (3–1) against the L.A. Rams (2–2) and New Orleans (1–3).
The L.A. Rams finished second in the NFC West based on better division record (4–2) than New Orleans (3–3).
Rams earned the #2 NFC Wild Card based on better conference record (8–4, .667) than the N.Y. Giants (9–5, .642) and New Orleans (6–6, .500).

Playoffs

Statistical leaders

Team

Awards

Coaching changes

Offseason
Green Bay Packers: Forrest Gregg left to join the SMU Mustangs. Lindy Infante was named as Gregg's replacement.
Los Angeles Raiders: Tom Flores stepped down to move to the team's front office. Mike Shanahan was named as the team's new head coach.

In-season
Detroit Lions: Darryl Rogers was fired after 11 games and replaced by defensive coordinator Wayne Fontes.

Stadium changes
The relocated Phoenix Cardinals moved from Busch Memorial Stadium in St. Louis to Sun Devil Stadium in Tempe, Arizona

Uniform changes
 Referees were outfitted with white hats while all other officials wore black hats, which was the standard practice in college and high school football.  From 1979 through 1987, referees wore black hats while all other officials wore white hats.
 The Green Bay Packers removed the elliptical green circles with the player's number from the hip area of the pants, an addition made in 1984 by former coach Forrest Gregg.
 The New England Patriots dropped the red road pants they had worn since 1984. The red pants returned in 1990.
 The San Diego Chargers switched to a darker shade of blue on their jerseys, from gold to blue face masks, and from gold to white lightning bolts. The helmets remained unchanged until a complete redesign in 2007.

Television
This was the second year under the league's three-year broadcast contracts with ABC, CBS, NBC, and ESPN to televise Monday Night Football, the NFC package, the AFC package, and Sunday Night Football, respectively. Joe Theismann took over as lead color commentator in ESPN's booth, replacing Roy Firestone, while the weekly "guest color commentator" spot was discontinued. Meanwhile, Dick Butkus joined The NFL Today as analyst, alongside host Brent Musburger and Irv Cross.

A number of NBC's regular NFL commentators were temporarily replaced while they called the network's coverage of the 1988 Summer Olympics in Seoul, South Korea from September 17 to October 2. Among them, Len Berman returned to the NFL on NBC pregame show to fill-in for host Bob Costas, while Curt Gowdy, Ray Scott, Chuck Thompson, Marty Glickman, Merle Harmon, and Al DeRogatis filled-in on the network's various broadcast crews.

References 

 NFL Record and Fact Book
 NFL History 1981–1990 (Last accessed December 4, 2005)
 Total Football: The Official Encyclopedia of the National Football League

1988
National Football League